Biddleville may refer to:
Biddleville, California, former name of Bear Valley, Mariposa County, California
Biddleville, Berkeley, California
Biddleville (Charlotte neighborhood)